Eupithecia albispumata is a moth in the  family Geometridae. It is found from the southern and western Himalaya (Nepal and Assam) to southern China (Yunnan) and northern Myanmar.

References

Moths described in 1893
albispumata
Moths of Asia